Notable people with the surname of Rollett include:

 Alexander Rollett (1834–1903), Austrian physiologist and histologist.
 Anthony Rollett, Fellow of the Institute of Physics.
 Georg Anton Rollett (1778–1842), Austrian naturalist and physician.
 Hilda Rollett (1873–1970), New Zealand teacher, journalist and writer.